The 2023 FIFA Women's World Cup will be the ninth edition of the FIFA Women's World Cup, the quadrennial international women's association football championship contested by women's national teams and organised by FIFA. The tournament will be jointly hosted by Australia and New Zealand, and is scheduled to take place from 20 July to 20 August 2023; it will be the first FIFA Women's World Cup to have more than one host nation, and also the first senior World Cup for either sex to be held across multiple confederations, as Australia is in the Asian Confederation while New Zealand is in the Oceanian Confederation. In addition, this tournament will be the first to feature the expanded format of 32 teams from the previous 24, replicating the same format used for the men's World Cup from 1998 to 2022. The opening match will be contested between New Zealand and Norway at Eden Park, Auckland on 20 July 2023. The final will take place on 20 August 2023 at Sydney Olympic Stadium in Australia. The United States are the defending champions, having won the previous two tournaments.

Host selection

Bidding began for the 2023 FIFA Women's World Cup on 19 February 2019. Member associations interested in hosting the tournament had to submit a declaration of interest by 15 March, and provide the completed bidding registration by 16 April. However, FIFA revised the bidding timeline as the tournament expanded to 32 teams on 31 July. Other member associations interested in hosting the tournament now had until 16 August to submit a declaration of interest, while the completed bidding registration of new member associations and re-confirmation of prior bidders was due by 2 September.

Nine countries initially indicated interest in hosting the events: Argentina, Australia, Bolivia, Brazil, Colombia, Japan, South Korea (with interest in a joint bid with North Korea), New Zealand and South Africa. Belgium expressed interest in hosting the tournament following the new deadline but later dropped out, as did Bolivia, in September 2019. Australia and New Zealand later announced they would merge their bids in a joint submission. Brazil, Colombia, and Japan joined them in submitting their bid books to FIFA by 13 December. However, both Brazil and Japan later withdrew their bids in June 2020 before the final voting.

On 25 June 2020, Australia and New Zealand won the bid to host the Women's World Cup. The decision came after a vote by the FIFA Council, with the winning bid earning 22 votes, while Colombia earned 13. Neither country had previously hosted a senior FIFA tournament. This will be the first Women's World Cup to be hosted in multiple countries, and only the second World Cup tournament to do so, following the 2002 FIFA World Cup, held in Japan and South Korea. It is also the first FIFA Women's World Cup to be held in the Southern Hemisphere, the first senior FIFA tournament to be held in Oceania, and the first FIFA tournament to be hosted across multiple confederations (with Australia in the AFC and New Zealand in the OFC). Australia is the second association from the AFC to host the Women's World Cup, after China in both 1991 and 2007.

Format
In July 2019, FIFA President Gianni Infantino proposed an expansion of the Women's World Cup from 24 to 32 teams, starting with the 2023 edition, and doubling the tournament's prize money. The proposal came following the success of the 2019 FIFA Women's World Cup and the prior edition of the tournament in 2015, which after increasing from 16 to 24 teams set an attendance record for all FIFA competitions besides the men's FIFA World Cup. Expanding the tournament to allow eight additional participating teams gave more member associations a greater opportunity to qualify for the final tournament. This fostered the growing reach and professionalisation of the women's game.

On 31 July, the FIFA Council unanimously decided to expand the tournament to 32 teams, featuring eight groups of four.

The tournament opens with a group stage consisting of eight groups of four teams, with the top two teams progressing from each group to a knockout tournament starting with a round of 16 teams. The number of games played overall increases from 52 to 64. The tournament replicates the format of the men's FIFA World Cup used between 1998 to 2022.

Teams

Qualification

FIFA's confederations organised their qualifications through continental championships, with the exception of UEFA which organised its own qualifying competition. Australia and New Zealand, as co-hosts, qualified automatically for the tournament, leaving the remaining 207 FIFA member associations eligible to enter qualification if they chose to do so. Australia competed at the 2022 AFC Women's Asian Cup, whilst New Zealand did not enter the OFC Women's Nations Cup the same year. The reigning Women's World Cup champions United States competed in qualification through the CONCACAF W Championship as normal.

The Chadian and Pakistani football associations were suspended by FIFA, thus excluding them from entering qualifications. Rwanda, Sudan, DR Congo and São Tomé and Príncipe entered qualification but withdrew later. Kenya withdrew before the second round of qualifiers. North Korea and Turkmenistan withdrew from the Women's Asian Cup qualifiers due to safety concerns and travel restrictions related to the COVID-19 pandemic. Iraq withdrew after the AFC draw. Due to the uncertainty of women's sport after the Taliban takeover of the country, Afghanistan withdrew from qualification. Due to COVID-19 pandemic outbreaks in their squads, Women's Asian Cup hosts India withdrew from qualification. American Samoa withdrew due to continuing difficulties related to the pandemic. Russia were disqualified from competing due to the Russian invasion of Ukraine.

The allocation of slots for each confederation was confirmed by the FIFA Council on 25 December 2020. The slots for the two host nations were taken directly from the quotas allocated to their confederations. 
AFC (Asia): 6 slots (including co-hosts Australia)
CAF (Africa): 4 slots 
CONCACAF (North America, Central America and the Caribbean): 4 slots
CONMEBOL (South America): 3 slots
OFC (Oceania): 1 slot (including co-hosts New Zealand)
UEFA (Europe): 11 slots
Inter-confederation play-off tournament: 3 slots

A ten-team play-off tournament will decide the final three spots at the Women's World Cup. The play-off slot allocation is as follows:
AFC (Asia): 2 slots
CAF (Africa): 2 slots
CONCACAF (North America, Central America and the Caribbean): 2 slots
CONMEBOL (South America): 2 slots
OFC (Oceania): 1 slot
UEFA (Europe): 1 slot

Of the 32 nations qualified for the 2023 FIFA Women's World Cup, 20 countries competed at the previous tournament in 2019. Haiti, Morocco, Panama, the Philippines, Portugal, the Republic of Ireland, Vietnam and Zambia will be making their debuts at the FIFA Women's World Cup. This World Cup will be the first ever FIFA tournament the Philippines have taken part in. This is Panama's, Portugal's and Vietnam's first ever FIFA women's competition, having only taken part in various FIFA men's tournaments. Zambia made history as the first landlocked country in Africa to qualify for a World Cup for either sex. Morocco became the first-ever Arab country to qualify for the Women's World Cup, while the Republic of Ireland marked their first-ever debut at any senior women's tournament. Denmark made their first appearance in 16 years after missing three consecutive tournaments, their last appearance being in 2007. Costa Rica, Colombia and Switzerland returned to the tournament after missing the previous one in 2019. Italy qualified for two consecutive women's World Cups for the first time in their history, after three sporadic appearances in 1991, 1999 and 2019.

Thailand, Cameroon, Chile, and Scotland, all of whom qualified for the 2019 Women’s World Cup, did not qualify for the 2023 tournament. Iceland was the highest ranked team in the FIFA Women's World Rankings that failed to qualify, ranked 16th. Zambia were the lowest ranked team to qualify, ranked 81st.

AFC (6)
  (co-hosts)
 
 
  (debut)
 
  (debut)

CAF (4)
  (debut)
 
 
  (debut)

CONCACAF (6)
 
 
  (debut)
 
  (debut)
 

CONMEBOL (3)
 
 
 

OFC (1)
  (co-hosts)

UEFA (12)
 
 
 
 
 
 
 
  (debut)
  (debut)

Draw

The final draw took place at the Aotea Centre in Auckland, New Zealand, on 22 October 2022 at 19:30 NZDT (UTC+13), prior to the completion of qualification. The three winners of the inter-confederation play-off were not known at the time of the draw.

Retired American international and 2-time Women's World Cup champion Carli Lloyd and CNN International sports presenter Amanda Davies conducted the draw. Each confederation had a retired international representing them as a draw assistant: Maia Jackman of New Zealand for the OFC and Julie Dolan of Australia for the AFC alongside men's internationals Ian Wright of England for UEFA, Alexi Lalas of the United States for CONCACAF, Geremi of Cameroon for the CAF and 2002 World Cup winner Gilberto Silva of Brazil for CONMEBOL. Snowboarding Olympic gold medalist Zoi Sadowski-Synnott of New Zealand and 4-time swimming Olympic gold medalist Cate Campbell of Australia also assisted the draw.

For the draw, the 32 teams were allocated into four pots based on the FIFA Women's World Rankings of 13 October 2022. Pot one contained both co-hosts New Zealand and Australia (both automatically placed in positions A1 and B1, respectively) along with the best six teams. Pot two contained the next best eight teams, with the next best eight teams being allocated into the following pot (pot three). Pot four contained the lowest ranked teams, along with the placeholders for the three inter-confederation play-off winners. With the exception of UEFA, teams from the same confederation could not be drawn in the same group. However, since each inter-confederation play-off group contained multiple confederations, the placeholders were identified by the seeded teams in their respective play-off pathways to avoid any draw constraints. The draw started with pot one and ended with pot four, with the team selected being allocated to the first available group alphabetically. Pot 1 teams were automatically drawn to position 1 of each group, with the following positions drawn for the remaining pots. The pots for the draws are shown below.

Venues
Australia and New Zealand proposed 13 possible venues across 12 host cities for the tournament in the bid book submitted to FIFA, suggesting a minimum of 10 stadiums be used—five in each country. The original proposal of the joint bid would have seen the venues be divided into three main travel hubs: South Hub containing Perth, Adelaide, Launceston and Melbourne, East Hub containing Brisbane, Newcastle, Sydney, Melbourne and Launceston, and New Zealand Hub containing Auckland, Hamilton, Wellington, Christchurch, and Dunedin. The Sydney Football Stadium was the only new stadium within the bid that is undergoing a major renovation, replacing the old football stadium on the same site.

The bid evaluation was released on 10 June 2020 by FIFA, which noted that the majority of the stadiums listed in the bid meet FIFA's hosting requirements with capacity, aside from Adelaide and Auckland which didn't meet the minimum requirements capacity wise for stages of the competition proposed for. Most stadiums featured in the bid are planned to have minor renovations with new floodlighting, pitch renovations and gender-neutral changing rooms in time for the tournament.

On 31 March 2021, FIFA announced the final host city and venue selections. Five cities and six stadiums will be used in Australia, and four cities and stadiums in New Zealand. From the proposed venues, Newcastle and Launceston were not selected in Australia, and Christchurch was omitted in New Zealand. Eden Park in Auckland will host the opening game, with Stadium Australia in Sydney to host the 2023 Women's World Cup final match. As a part of the branding, all cities will use native names (Indigenous Australian and Māori in New Zealand) alongside their English names in an effort to "reconcile and respect the original owners of the land."

Eden Park, Auckland will host New Zealand's opening match, and Stadium Australia, Sydney will host Australia's opening match (both group stages). Lang Park, Brisbane will host the 3rd place match on 19 August; and Stadium Australia, Sydney will host the final which will be held on 20 August.

Team base camps 

Base camps will be used by the 32 national squads to stay and train before and during the Women's World Cup tournament. FIFA announced the hotels and training sites for the 29 qualified participating nations on December 11, 2022, with the remaining 3 qualified teams selecting their base camps after the Play-off Tournament.

Schedule

The match schedule was announced by FIFA on 1 December 2021 without kick-off times. The opening match of the tournament, featuring co-hosts New Zealand, will be played on 20 July 2023 at Eden Park. Whilst the inaugural match in Australia, was set to take place on the same day at Sydney Football Stadium. Later, the schedule was tweaked by moving the Australia vs Republic of Ireland to the Sydney Olympic Stadium. The group stage fixtures will be split between the co-hosts with each hosting four groups. The third-place match will be played at Lang Park on 19 August 2023, with the final to be played at Stadium Australia on 20 August 2023.

The group stage fixtures for each group will be allocated to the following host country:

 Groups A, C, E, G: New Zealand (Auckland, Dunedin, Hamilton, Wellington)
 Groups B, D, F, H: Australia (Adelaide, Brisbane, Melbourne, Perth, Sydney)

The final kick-off times were confirmed on 24 October 2022, two days after the draw, in order to "optimise the specific match details for the benefit of supporters, teams and the media". On 31 January 2023, it was confirmed that Australia vs Republic of Ireland had been moved from Sydney Football Stadium to the larger Sydney Olympic Stadium due to strong ticketing demand.

Officiating

In January 2023, the FIFA Referees Committee announced the list of 33 referees, 55 assistant referees, and 19 video assistant referees for the tournament.

For the first time in the FIFA Women's World Cup, six female video assistant referees were also appointed.

Group stage
Competing countries were divided into eight groups of four teams (groups A to H). Teams in each group will play one another in a round-robin, with the top two teams advancing to the knockout stage.

Group A

Group B

Group C

Group D

Group E

Group F

Group G

Group H

Knockout stage

In the knockout stage, if a match is level at the end of 90 minutes of normal playing time, extra time will be played (two periods of 15 minutes each). If the score was still level after extra time, the winners will be determined by a penalty shoot-out.

Bracket

Round of 16

Quarter-finals

Semi-finals

Third place play-off

Final

Marketing

Branding
The official emblem was jointly designed by Toronto-based studio Public Address and Los Angeles-based Works Creative Agency and unveiled on 28 October 2021 during a live show. The emblem features a football encircled by 32 coloured squares, reflecting the expanded field of the tournament, and the natural terrains of the two host nations. The overall branding of the tournament will feature designs reflecting the host nations' Indigenous peoples, created by Australian artist Chern'ee Sutton and Maori artist Fiona Collis. Furthermore, the tournament's branding will also incorporate the native names of all host cities. Alongside the emblem, the official slogan of the tournament, "Beyond Greatness", reflects FIFA's goal for the event to further expand the prominence of women's football, was also revealed. The names of the host cities in their native names (Indigenous Australian and Māori in New Zealand) were used as part of the official branding.

Broadcasting rights

Unlike previous editions, this is the first Women's World Cup to be commercialized as a standalone product rather than being packaged alongside the Men's World Cup. FIFA stated that they have had "huge interest" and are expecting more regional partners to sign on. FIFA are also aiming to reach a global audience of 2 billion, up from 1.12 billion at the previous edition in France.

In October 2022, FIFA rejected multiple bids from various public and private broadcasters for significantly underpriced bids, urging broadcasters to be paying what the women's game deserves. Romy Gai, FIFA's Chief Business Officer, called on broadcasters to seize the "opportunity" provided by the women's game, further saying that these bids did not reflect the popularity of women's football, noting the record viewership figures of the 2019 Women's World Cup.

Gianni Infantino later expressed his disappointment during a FIFA Council meeting towards broadcasters offering "100 times less" compared to the men's tournament, claiming that the women's game is exponentially growing with similar viewership figures to the World Cup, and wished that the market be willing to consider a more appropriate value of the broadcast rights for the tournament.

Sponsorship

Symbols

Mascot 
The tournament's official mascot was unveiled on 19 October 2022. The mascot's name is Tazuni, which is a portmanteau of the Tasman Sea and 'Unity'. It represents a little penguin (Eudyptula minor), endemic to New Zealand, FIFA incorrectly stated this penguin (E. minor) was endemic in Australia, where a closely related species (Eudyptula novaehollandiae) was described as a new and distinct in 2016.

Music
On 28 October 2021 same day as the official emblem and slogan unveiling, British DJ and music producer Kelly Lee Owens released "Unity" as the theme song for the event.

Controversies

Russian participation
On 9 December 2019, the World Anti-Doping Agency initially handed Russia a four-year ban from all major sporting events, after the Russian Anti-Doping Agency (RUSADA) was found non-compliant for handing over manipulated laboratory data to investigators. However, the Russian national team could have still entered qualification, as the ban only applies to the final tournament to decide the world champions. The WADA ruling allowed athletes who were not involved in doping or the coverup to compete; however, a team representing Russia that uses the Russian flag and anthem cannot participate under the WADA decision. The decision was appealed to the Court of Arbitration for Sport, which upheld WADA's ban but reduced it to two years. The CAS ruling also allowed the name "Russia" to be displayed on uniforms if the words "Neutral Athlete" or "Neutral Team" have equal prominence. Had Russia qualified for the tournament, its female players would have been able to use their country's name, flag or anthem at the Women's World Cup, unlike their male counterparts, as the ban expired on 16 December 2022.

However, following the 2022 Russian invasion of Ukraine, FIFA announced a number of sanctions impacting Russia's participation in international football on 27 February 2022. Russia was prohibited from hosting international competitions, and the national team had been ordered to play all home matches behind closed doors in neutral countries. Under these sanctions, Russia would not be allowed to compete under the country's name, flag, or national anthem; similarly to the Russian athletes' participation in events such as the Olympics, the team would compete under the abbreviation of their national federation, the Russian Football Union ("RFU"), rather than "Russia". The women's team had remained largely unaffected with participation in qualifications albeit suspended "until further notice". On 2 May, UEFA announced further sanctions regarding the ongoing suspension, ruling the women's team ineligible to compete further in the UEFA qualifiers. Consequently, this led to Denmark's automatic qualification to the Women's World Cup, as a result of the suspension.

Saudi Arabia tourism sponsorship
On 1 February 2023, FIFA announced that Visit Saudi, the tourism board of Saudi Arabia, will be potentially one of the main sponsors of the tournament. FIFA opted to sign the quota sale contract without consulting any instance of the two host countries. Shortly after the announcement, the Organizing Committee asked the entity for clarification on how this advertisement and the partnership would work. Human Rights Watch said the decision showed disregard for how Saudi Arabia treats women. The decision was called sportswashing by human rights campaigns. Notable women's players such as Alex Morgan, Emma Hayes, Becky Sauerbrunn and Megan Rapinoe, also denounced the deal and urged FIFA not to sign it. In March 2023, Football Australia and New Zealand Football  publicly opposed the potential sponsorship. In March 2023, FIFA announced they would drop the sponsorship deal.

References

External links

Australia-New Zealand 2023 bid website

 
FIFA Women's World Cup tournaments
FIFA Women's World Cup, 2023
International women's association football competitions hosted by Australia
International women's association football competitions hosted by New Zealand
FIFA
2023 in New Zealand women's sport
2023–24 in Australian women's soccer

FIFA
FIFA
FIFA
FIFA
Australia–New Zealand sports relations
Sports events affected by the 2022 Russian invasion of Ukraine